US Post Office—Akron is a historic post office building located at Akron, Erie County, New York. It was designed and built 1939–1940, and is one of a number of post offices in New York State designed by the Office of the Supervising Architect of the Treasury Department, Louis A. Simon. The building is in the Colonial Revival style and is virtually identical to the post offices at Scotia, Oxford, Middleburgh, and Horseheads. The interior features a mural by Elizabeth Logan painted in 1941 and titled Horse-Drawn Railroad.

It was listed on the National Register of Historic Places in 1989.

References

External links
US Post Office-Akron - U.S. National Register of Historic Places on Waymarking.com
Western New York Heritage Press: Akron, NY Post Office Mural photo

Akron
Government buildings completed in 1939
Colonial Revival architecture in New York (state)
Akron
National Register of Historic Places in Erie County, New York